Conspiracy against rights is a federal offense in the United States of America under :

If two or more persons conspire to injure, oppress, threaten, or intimidate any person [...] in the free exercise or enjoyment of any right or privilege secured to him by the Constitution or laws of the United States, or because of his having so exercised the same;...

They shall be fined under this title or imprisoned not more than ten years, or both; and if death results from the acts committed in violation of this section or if such acts include kidnapping or an attempt to kidnap, aggravated sexual abuse or an attempt to commit aggravated sexual abuse, or an attempt to kill, they shall be fined under this title or imprisoned for any term of years or for life, or both, or may be sentenced to death.

Common law intent requirement
The Supreme Court held that a conviction under a related statute, 18 U.S.C. §242, required proof of the defendant's specific intent to deprive the victim of a constitutional right. In United States v. Guest, the Supreme Court read this same requirement into §241, the conspiracy statute.

See also 

 Transnational authoritarianism

References 

Civil rights and liberties
Conspiracy (criminal)
United States federal law
Political crimes